Francofonia is a 2015 internationally co-produced drama film directed by Alexander Sokurov. It was screened in the main competition section of the 72nd Venice International Film Festival and in the Masters section of the 2015 Toronto International Film Festival. The film won the Mimmo Rotella Award at Venice. Variety defined it as a "dense, enriching meditation on the Louvre and specifically (but not exclusively) the museum’s status during WWII".

Among the works of art referenced in the film are:
 The Mona Lisa
 The Raft of the Medusa

Cast
 Louis-Do de Lencquesaing as Jacques Jaujard
  as Napoléon Bonaparte
  as Franz von Wolff-Metternich
 Johanna Korthals Altes as Marianne

Reception

Critical response
Francofonia has an approval rating of 87% on review aggregator website Rotten Tomatoes, based on 75 reviews, and an average rating of 6.90/10. The website's critical consensus states, "Francofonia may test the patience of the uninitiated, but viewers willing to delve into a beautifully filmed look at the intersection of art and war will be richly rewarded". It also has a score of 71 out of 100 on Metacritic, based on 25 critics, indicating "generally favorable reviews".

Awards

References

External links
 

2015 films
2015 drama films
2010s French-language films
French drama films
2010s Russian-language films
Films directed by Alexander Sokurov
2010s French films